Anghellic is the third studio album by American rapper Tech N9ne from Kansas City, Missouri. It was released on August 28, 2001 via Universal Music Group imprint JCOR Entertainment, and was re-released as Anghellic: Reparation in 2003 via Strange Music after conflicts with JCOR Entertainment during its original release. The album peaked at number 59 on the Billboard 200.

In 2001, the song "Tormented" appeared in a scene of the television series Dark Angel, playing for nearly two minutes in the background of a bar scene contained in the season two episode "Two". In 2009, Fangoria named it as an iconic horrorcore album.

Track listing

Notes
  signifies a co-producer

Track listing

Sample credits
Hellevator
 Clips from Hellraiser
Sinister Tech
 Uses the roar of Gabara in the film Godzilla's Revenge
Psycho Messages / Psycho Bitch
"Halloween theme" by John Carpenter
Here I Come
"Für Elise" by Ludwig van Beethoven
Twisted
"I Want to Be Your Man" by Zapp & Roger
"Computer Love" by Zapp & Roger
Einstein
"Einstein" by Bobby Orlando released as The Beat Box Boys (1984) features the voice and music of Bobby Orlando.
PR 2K1- sampled from Drag Rap by the showboys

Charts

References

External links

2001 albums
G-funk albums
Tech N9ne albums
Horrorcore albums
Strange Music albums